Marte may refer to:

Marte, Nigeria, a Local Government Area in Borno State
Marte (surname), including a list of people with the name
C.D. Marte, a Mexican football club
C.D. Atlético Marte, a Salvadoran football club
ST Marte, a tug in service with Wilson Son SA Comercio Industria, Brazil from 1966
Marte (missile), anti-ship missile

See also
 Mars (disambiguation)